The Lilian Voudouri Music Library of Greece is a library located in Greece that specializes in music and was created under an initiative of the Friends of Music Society. The library opened to the public in February 1997. The library’s collection is primarily made up of western European music, going back to ancient Greek music. The collection also includes material on world music, jazz, ancient Greek art, theater, dance, literature, philosophy, and fine art. The library's collection includes books, audio recordings, musical scores, microforms, journals, concert programs, CD-ROMs, and databases.

References

External links
Music Library of Greece "Lilian Voudouri"
Athens Concert Hall
International Index to Music Periodicals

Library buildings completed in 1997
Libraries in Athens
Music libraries
Music organizations based in Greece
Libraries established in 1997